The 1964 United States presidential election in Virginia took place on November 3, 1964. All 50 states and the District of Columbia were part of the 1964 United States presidential election. Virginia voters chose 12 electors to the Electoral College, which selected the president and vice president of the United States.

Virginia was won by incumbent President Lyndon B. Johnson of Texas with 53.54% of the vote, who was running against U.S. Senator Barry Goldwater of Arizona. Johnson also won the national election in a landslide with 61.05% of the vote. However, the state would not vote for another Democratic candidate until Barack Obama won the state in 2008.

, this remains the last occasion when Amherst County, Bland County, Clarke County, Culpeper County, Fauquier County, Frederick County, Rockingham County, Washington County and York County have voted for a Democratic presidential candidate. It is also the only time since 1948 Waynesboro City has voted for a Democrat for president, while Prince William County and Winchester City would not vote Democratic again until 2008. Fairfax County, Virginia's most populous county, would not vote Democratic again until 2004, having last voted Democratic in 1940 before this election. The independent city of Virginia Beach would not vote Democratic again until 2020. This also remains the last time that Virginia and neighboring West Virginia would simultaneously vote Democratic in a presidential election.

Results

Results by county

References

Virginia
1964
1964 Virginia elections